20th Century Masters – The Millennium Collection: The Best of Billy Ray Cyrus is a compilation album released from Billy Ray Cyrus. The album was released on March 23, 2003, via Mercury Nashville Records. The album debuted and peaked at number 59 on the U.S. Billboard Top Country Albums chart. The album was released as part of Universal Music Group's 20th Century Masters – The Millennium Collection series. The album was released without Cyrus' supervision, and no new material was recorded for this album.

Track listing

Critical reception 

20th Century Masters – The Millennium Collection: The Best of Billy Ray Cyrus received four out of five stars from Stephen Thomas Erlewine of Allmusic. In his review, Erlewine praises the album as "a far better bargain than the previous Cyrus collection, and one that's not likely to be bettered anytime soon."

Chart performance 
20th Century Masters – The Millennium Collection: The Best of Billy Ray Cyrus peaked at number 59 on the U.S. Billboard Top Country Albums chart.

References

Billy Ray Cyrus albums
Cyrus, Billy
2003 greatest hits albums
Mercury Records compilation albums